Blues Image was an American rock band. They had a hit in 1970 with "Ride Captain Ride", which reached No. 4 on both the Billboard Hot 100 and the Canadian RPM magazine charts.

Career
Blues Image was formed in Tampa, Florida in 1966 by singer-guitarist Mike Pinera, singer-drummer Manuel "Manny" Bertematti, singer-percussionist Joe Lala, keyboardist Emilio Garcia, and bassist Malcolm Jones. They were later joined by keyboardist Frank "Skip" Konte when Emilio Garcia left the band to become a pilot. Blues Image moved to Miami in 1968, where they were instrumental in helping promoters form the most innovative music venue in South Florida, Thee Image. Blues Image became the house band at the club, which featured bands like Cream, Grateful Dead, and Blood, Sweat & Tears.

The band moved to Los Angeles and signed with Atco Records, releasing their self-titled debut album in February 1969.  Their second album, Open (April 1970), included the single "Ride Captain Ride." Written by Pinera and Konte, it featured Kent Henry on guitar solo and fills, Pinera playing solo at the end. The album sold over one million copies, and earned a gold record from the R.I.A.A. in August 1970.  It was Blues Image's only charting hit, making the group a one-hit wonder.

Pinera left the band to join Iron Butterfly in the fall of 1969, during the recording of Open, and was replaced by singer Denny Correll and guitarist Kent Henry. The band broke up after the release of their third album, Red White & Blues Image, in May 1970.

The various members of Blues Image went on to become parts of other rock bands. Bertematti later played and recorded with New Cactus Band and toured with Iron Butterfly, Chi Coltrane, and Bobby Womack. Pinera also played with Iron Butterfly, New Cactus Band, Ramatam, and Alice Cooper. Konte joined Three Dog Night, and Lala played with Crosby, Stills, Nash & Young. Lala's percussion work also figures prominently on the Stephen Stills/Chris Hillman led group, Manassas. Henry played lead guitar with Steppenwolf prior to their break-up in 1972.

Correll later recorded a series of successful contemporary Christian music (CCM) albums, helped expand the genre's commercial appeal, and achieved airplay with several singles on CCM radio during the late 1970s and early 1980s. He died in 2002. Gary Dunham, who also toured with the last incarnation of Blues Image, also became a solo CCM artist.

Pinera has released several solo albums, including In the Garden of Eden.

Joe Lala died of complications from lung cancer on March 18, 2014, at the age of 66.

The group can briefly be seen performing "Ride Captain Ride" in the 1971 film, Dusty and Sweets McGee.

Personnel
 Manuel "Manny" Bertematti - drums, vocals (1966-1970)
 Joe Lala - percussion, vocals (1966-1970; died 2014)
 Malcolm Jones - bass (1966-1970)
 Mike Pinera - guitar, vocals (1966-1970)
 Emilio Garcia - keyboards (1966-1967)
 Frank "Skip" Konte - keyboards (1967-1970)
 Denny Correll - vocals (1970; died 2002)
 Kent Henry - guitar (1970; died 2009)
 Michael Franklin
 Tim Franklin
 Bill Britton - guitar (1967; left band 1969)

Discography

Albums

Compilation albums

Singles

References

External links
 
 
 Blues Image biography at Oldies.com
  Mike Pinera biography
 Mike Pinera fansite
 45cat.com entry as 'Blues Image'
 45cat.com entry as 'The Blues Image'

Musical groups from Tampa, Florida
Rock music groups from Florida
Atco Records artists
1966 establishments in Florida
Musical groups disestablished in 1970
Musical groups established in 1966